Adenanthos acanthophyllus, commonly known as prickly woollybush, is a species of shrub endemic to Western Australia.

It often has many stems arising from a lignotuber. It blooms between April and June producing pink-red and green flowers.

The broad lobes armed with spines. The leaves resemble those of members of other proteaceous genera such as Isopogon baxteri. It is the most northerly species of the genus Adenanthos, found over  disjunct from the nearest known populations of any other species.
 
It is found in coastal areas of the Mid West and Gascoyne regions of Western Australia where it grows in sandy soils. It is often the dominant plant in the areas where it is found. It is also part of the tree heath at the overlap between the South West and the Eremaean botanical provinces in the Shark Bay World Heritage Area.

Other species found in the same area include: Eucalyptus beardiana, Grevillea rogersoniana, Acacia drepanophylla, Verticordia cooloomia, Eucalyptus roycei and Hakea stenophylla''.

References

acanthophyllus
Eudicots of Western Australia
Plants described in 1974